Streptomyces fildesensis is a bacterium species from the genus of Streptomyces which has been isolated from antarctic soil.

See also 
 List of Streptomyces species

References

External links 
Type strain of Streptomyces fildesensis at BacDive -  the Bacterial Diversity Metadatabase

fildesensis
Bacteria described in 2012